Adam Aaron Hauser (born May 27, 1980) is an American former ice hockey goaltender. He played one game in the National Hockey League with the Los Angeles Kings during the 2005–06 season. The rest of his career, which lasted from 2002 to 2012, was spent in the minor leagues and them in the Deutsche Eishockey Liga.

Playing career
Hauser played his college career at the University of Minnesota, culminating his college career with an NCAA Division I National Championship in 2002. He finished his career with 83 wins, which was a WCHA record. Hauser is the Minnesota career leader in games played, and saves.

Initially selected by the Edmonton Oilers, 81st overall, in the 1999 NHL Entry Draft. Hauser signed as a free agent with the Los Angeles Kings' organization prior to the 2004–05 season. In the year, Hauser set several records for the Kings' AHL affiliate, the Manchester Monarchs. These records included best GAA (1.93), best save percentage (.933), and most shutouts (12). In his third year within the Kings' organization he made his NHL debut, and only game, on January 14, 2006, against the Buffalo Sabres.

Hauser then left for Europe the following season and has played with Kölner Haie, Adler Mannheim and the Kassel Huskies in the Deutsche Eishockey Liga.

After the Huskies folded prior to the 2010–11 season, Hauser joined the neighboring Austrian Hockey League, signing a try-out contract with the Vienna Capitals on September 16, 2010.

Career statistics

Regular season and playoffs

Awards and honors

References

External links
 
 Official Website

1980 births
Living people
Adler Mannheim players
American men's ice hockey goaltenders
Edmonton Oilers draft picks
Ice hockey players from Minnesota
Jackson Bandits players
Kassel Huskies players
Kölner Haie players
Los Angeles Kings players
Manchester Monarchs (AHL) players
Minnesota Golden Gophers men's ice hockey players
NCAA men's ice hockey national champions
People from Bovey, Minnesota
Providence Bruins players
Reading Royals players
USA Hockey National Team Development Program players
Vienna Capitals players
American expatriate ice hockey players in Austria
American expatriate ice hockey players in Germany
SC Bietigheim-Bissingen players